Leatherwood is an unincorporated community within Perry County, Kentucky, United States. At one point, it was called Toner. The Post Office  has been closed.

References

Unincorporated communities in Perry County, Kentucky
Unincorporated communities in Kentucky
Coal towns in Kentucky